Propiska is both a residency permit and a migration recording tool, generally referred to as an  Internal passport:

 Propiska in the Russian Empire
 Propiska in the Soviet Union
 Propiska in Ukraine; see :uk:Прописка#Прописка в Україні (in Ukrainian Wikipedia)
 Propiska in Belarus
 Propiska in Kazakhstan
 Current propiska in Uzbekistan

See also 
 Current resident registration in Russia